The Palestinian National Authority requires their residents register their motor vehicles and display vehicle registration plates.
There are two different systems of registration plates: One for West Bank and other in Gaza Strip.

West Bank

Private vehicles since July 2018
The Palestinian Authority's Ministry of Transport has announced a new numbering system for vehicles that will be registered as of July 2018. According to the new method, vehicles will have a 6-character license number, which includes 5 digits and one Latin letter (as opposed to the previous system where the license number was 7 digits). The change in format was done because the code Ramallah Governorate was running out of possible combinations.
The format will be #-####-X. The first five digits are a running number.
The last letter in the number shall be determined according to the governorate  in which the vehicle was registered, and may be:
	The letter A – Jenin
	The letter B – Tulkarm
	The letter C – Tubas
	The letter D – Nablus
	The letter E – Qalqilya 
	The letter F – Salfit
	The letter G – Jericho
	The letter H – Ramallah
	The letter J – Jerusalem
	The letter K – Bethlehem
	The letter L – Hebron, Hebron Governorate
	The letter M – Dura, Hebron Governorate
	The letter N – Yatta, Hebron Governorate

The following letters are reserved for the Gaza Strip but have not been implemented yet, as authorities in Gaza have implemented a different format since 2012:

  The letter P – North Gaza (Jabalia)
  The letter Q – Gaza
  The letter R – Deir al-Balah
  The letter S – Khan Yunis
  The letter T – Rafah

Motorcycle license plates have the same format and are treated as private vehicles, but are issued in two dimensions appropriate for back of a motorcycle.

Private vehicles between 1994 and July 2018

With the implementation of the Oslo II Accord and the transfer of some of the civil responsibilities in the occupied West Bank and Gaza Strip from Israeli Civil Administration to the Palestinian National Authority in 1994, a new license plate format was introduced to replace the license plate format formerly issued by the Israeli Civil Administration.

Private vehicles had white plates with green numbers, the numbers have seven digits, the first shows the district (governorate) of the registration:

Y-XXXX-ZZ

 where Y indicates the district (governorate) and can be:
 1: Gaza Strip, for vehicles registered prior to 1995 (Comprising North Gaza, Gaza, Central Gaza, Khan Yunis, and Rafah Governorates)
 3: Gaza Strip, for vehicles that are to be registered after 1995 (Comprising North Gaza, Gaza, Central Gaza, Khan Yunis, and Rafah Governorates) — the initial "3" has been kept after the introduction of a new license plate format in 2012, as previously discussed.
 4: Northern West Bank, for vehicles registered prior to 1995 (Comprising Jenin, Nablus, Qalqilya, Salfit, Tubas, and Tulkarm Governorates)
 5: Central West Bank, for vehicles registered prior to 1995 (Comprising Ramallah, Jerusalem, and Jericho Governorates)
 6:  Central West Bank, for vehicles that are to be registered after 1995 (Comprising Ramallah, Jerusalem, and Jericho Governorates)
 7: Northern West Bank, for vehicles that are to be registered after 1995 (Comprising Jenin, Nablus, Qalqilya, Salfit, Tubas, and Tulkarm Governorates)
 8: Southern West Bank, for vehicles registered prior to 1995 (Comprising Bethlehem and Hebron Governorates)
 9: Southern West Bank, for vehicles that are to be registered after 1995  (Comprising Bethlehem and Hebron Governorates)
 X can be any 4-digit number.
 ZZ
 For Privately-owned Vehicles, "ZZ" can be 40 to 49 and 90 to 98
 Generally, vehicles owned by the Palestinian Authority carry the code 99
 For vehicles that were registered prior to 1995 (District Codes 1, 4, 5, and 8), "ZZ" corresponds to the year in which the car was first registered
 77 to 79 respectively for vehicles registered from 1967 to 1969 
 70 to 76 respectively for vehicles registered from 1970 to 1976
 37 to 39 respectively for vehicles registered from 1977 to 1979
 40 to 49 respectively for vehicles registered from 1980 to 1989
 90 to 95 respectively for vehicles registered from 1990 to 1995
 For Public for-hire vehicles, "ZZ" is 30
 For Duty and tax-free vehicles (such as ambulances), "ZZ" is 31
 For Vehicles leased with the extension, "ZZ" is 32

For the first few years of issuance of this format, up until 2005, the shape and design of the license plate was slightly different. The positioning and the style of the Arabic letter "ف" and the English Letter "P" on the right hand side differed, with Arabic letter being on the bottom, and "P" on the top. The license plate also featured an embossed green Eagle of Saladdin, the official emblem of Palestine.

Motorcycle license plates had the same format and were treated as private vehicles, but were issued in two dimensions appropriate for back of a motorcycle.

Public transport

Vehicles serving the public transport (taxis, shared taxis, and buses) have green plates with white numbers. Taxi plates always end in -30.

Plates for government vehicles

Vehicles belonging to the Palestinian Authority use white number plates with red numbers. Those are officials' cars, ambulances, fire brigade police and special police (military).

The numbers match the format XXXX with leading zeros.

For the first few years of issuance of this format, up until 2005, the shape and design of the license plate was slightly different. 

Currently new registered police vehicles get also green-on-white plates ending in -99.

Stolen vehicle plates
This class of license plates, unique in the world, is the outcome of the complications related to the Israeli–Palestinian peace process.

With the signing of Gaza–Jericho Agreement, establishment of the Palestinian Civil Police Force, and replacement of Israel Police in most areas of the Gaza Strip with this newly created police force, Israeli car thieves fenced about 15,000 stolen cars into the Gaza Strip, where they were then sold, away from the reach of Israel Police. Israeli car owners, unable to retrieve their cars, would get reimbursed by their insurance, and they would go buy new cars. So in effect, Israeli insurance companies were paying for Gaza's used car trade. When the insurance companies sued, the Palestinian Authority settled, and the settlement cost was offset in part by much higher registration fees for cars that had been stolen. So to designate those cars, they were given special license plates. These license plates had black texts and black borders on a white background. On the right hand side, instead of having "P / ف" national identifiers, as was the norm with other types of registration plates. They had "ف / م". The Arabic letter "م" stands for المقيدة, meaning "Restricted", and in effect being a euphemism referring to the vehicle's origins. By 2005, the Palestinian Authority has phased this class of license plates out, and replaced them with typical license plates, as appropriate.

The Format of these license plates was YY-XXX, where YY could have been
 25 for government vehicles
 26 for police vehicles
 27-30 for privately owned vehicles

Test plates

Test plates for garages and car importers are blue with white writing and display the word "TEST" in Arabic and Hebrew above the number.

Gaza Strip

Until 2012 registration plates in the Gaza Strip had the same format as in the West Bank. In 2012 the authorities of the Gaza Strip replaced the PNA license plates described above with a new design. The new plates have a vertical Palestinian flag on the right (instead of the letters P/ف) in European style plate or horizontal flag on the top in American style plates. All the plates have white background. All numbers start with "3".

Private and governmental personal vehicles
Private and personal vehicles have black digits and borders. Private vehicle plate numbers end with "0X". Governmental personal vehicle numbers ending with "5X.

In 2021, vehicle license plates in the Gaza Strip underwent a design change, with a pattern of the word "Palestine" in Arabic and English overlaid on the numbers, and a horizontal Palestinian flag in place of the previous vertical, downward-facing flag.Motorcycle plates are rarely installed in the Gaza Strip.

Commercial vehicles
Commercial vehicles, such as trucks, have green digits and borders. Commercial vehicle plate numbers end with "1X".

Public vehicles
Public vehicles such as taxis and municipal vehicles, have blue digits and borders. Public vehicle plate numbers end with "2X". Municipal vehicle plate numbers end with "4X".

Governmental vehicles
Governmental vehicles, such as police cars, ministry of health-operated ambulances, and such, have red digits and borders. Governmental vehicle plate numbers end with "5X".

1967–1994

During this period of the Israeli governance of the West Bank and Gaza Strip, Palestinians had license plates issued by the Israeli civil administration.

West Bank
West Bank license plates had black text and black borders on a light blue background. Each region was assigned a Hebrew letter code. Initially, this letter code was placed on a separate square plate, and installed adjacent to the license plate. Later, in from late 1970s onward, the letter was incorporated onto the license plates, on the left hand side. The letter code was black on a background of either white or orange. White background generally implied that the vehicle owner lived in a city in the West Bank, whereas orange indicated that the owner lived in one of the towns and villages in the vicinity. For plate sizes specific to imported vehicles that could only accommodate an American-sized license plate, this letter was inside a white or orange rectangle, at the top, above the numbers.

It is important to note that these letter codes do not correspond to the modern Governorates of Palestine. For example, there was no code for what's today Tubas Governorate, and the corresponding area was treated as subdivisions of Jenin. Palestinian towns and villages in Jerusalem Governorate but outside the municipal boundaries of the unilaterally annexed areas of East Jerusalem were either treated as subdivisions of Ramallah or Bethlehem depending on the location.

For about two years, from 1967 to 1969, West Bank license plates consisted of five digits. They had six digits until near the end of 1970s, and since then, they had seven digits. The seven-digit format was XX-XXX-XX, similar to those of Israeli cars. The last two numbers in the West Bank (XX) were either "1X" or "3X",  whereas Israel avoided using these numbers on the yellow-coloured Israeli plates, thus avoiding the issue of duplicate numbers under the two parallel systems.

  – Jericho (which transliterates into Hebrew as )
  – Bethlehem
  – Hebron
  – Tulkarem
  – Jenin
  – Qalqilya
  – Ramallah
  – Nablus

Gaza Strip
Gaza Strip license plates had black letters and black borders on a white background, differing from the West Bank plates, as well as with the yellow Israeli plates. Similar to the occupied West Bank, each region was assigned a Hebrew letter code. Initially, this letter code was placed on a separate square plate, and installed adjacent to the license plate. Later, in from late 1970s onward, the letter was incorporated onto the license plates, on the left side, on a white background, and surrounded by a uniquely shaped, round-cornered rectangle. However, the format was slightly changed in late 1980s, with the letter code being moved to the right hand side, and having unique colours as opposed to black, for each of the 3 districts.

  – Deir al-Balah
  – Gaza
  – Rafah

1948–1967

References

Palestinian Authority
Transport in the State of Palestine